Arintica is a stratovolcano located in Arica y Parinacota Region of Chile, near the border with Bolivia. It lies north of the Salar de Surire. The volcano has a main summit in the north, a slightly shorter southern summit and a subsidiary peak in the west. A glacier valley lies between the summits. In total, five glaciers surrounded Arintica and drained into the Salar de Surire. Presently, rock glaciers are active on the mountain.

Potassium-argon dating has yielded an age of  years on rocks from Arintica. The volcano was constructed in two phases and postglacial lava flows have been found by Landsat imagery, but they are unsampled. A previously identified southeastern lava flow has been later identified as a debris avalanche, and other lava flows in the crater are actually rock glaciers. A dacitic lava dome is found southwest of the volcano and is named Calajata. In a 2011 hazard map Arintica was considered a potentially dangerous volcano of Chile. Whether the volcano was active in the Holocene is contentious and there is no indication of historical eruptions. Renewed activity would probably be of small magnitude and only have local impacts. A belt of Polylepis woods surrounds the volcano.

See also 
 Pukintika

References 

Volcanoes of Arica y Parinacota Region
Mountains of Chile
Stratovolcanoes of Chile
Pleistocene stratovolcanoes